The Severn class is the largest lifeboat operated by the Royal National Lifeboat Institution (RNLI). It is named after the River Severn, the longest river in Great Britain. The lifeboats are stationed at 35 locations around the coasts of the United Kingdom and Ireland and can provide coverage up to  out to sea.

History
This resulted in the  Severn and  Trent lifeboats.

The prototype Severn was launched in 1991 (ON1179) and was named Maurice and Joyce Hardy. Trials started the following year and lasted until 1998. In 1995, the boat was de-named. Problems were encountered during the trials with the "skegs" that protected the propellers, but were designed to protect the hull by breaking off if the boat hit rocks, as the first ones were too easily broken. Crashing through heavy seas at full speed caused damage to the hull, too. It was transferred to training work when it carried operational number TL-02 and was named Peter and Marion Fulton, but was withdrawn in 2004. It was sold in 2005; in 2008 it was in use as a dive boat at Buckie, carrying the name Gemini Storm. Sold to Montrose Marine Services ltd in 2011 and renamed Eileen May. Sold 2019 into private ownership, based North Wales coast.
The first production Severn was The Will. It had been built in 1995 by Berthon Boat Co (Builders of 21 of the 46 Severn-class lifeboats) for Stornoway but had to undergo several modifications before it was fit for service. It was eventually placed in the relief fleet in 1996 and shown to many lifeboat stations where the class was expected to be deployed. It so impressed the crew at Falmouth that they pressed the RNLI to station it there until their own boat was built, and so it was stationed there from January 1997 until December 2001 when it was replaced by Richard Scott Cox. In the meantime, Tom Sanderson had been deployed at Stornoway in 1999. The Will returned to the relief fleet after its time at Falmouth and has continued in that role since. Construction of its sister boats continued until 2005.

In 2015, the Canadian Coast Guard commissioned a version of the Severn class modified for extreme conditions found off the coast of Newfoundland and Nova Scotia.

In 2020 the RNLI started to design a Severn Life Extension Programme (SLEP) with the intention of extending the fleet's lifespan by 25 years. It involves taking an existing boat and fully refitting it from the hull up. The addition of modern electronic systems and shock mitigating seats similar to those found on the Shannon class lifeboats, are among many upgrades. In July 2022 it was announced that the prototype was almost complete and would soon be ready for sea trials.

Description
Severns are constructed of fibre reinforced composite material, and their hard chine semi-displacement hull is built so that it will stay afloat with two of its five compartments flooded. For added manoeuvrability, in addition to twin engines, the Severn also has a bow thruster fitted. The propellers are enclosed so that the Severn can take ground without damaging them. A  inflatable boat can be deployed by an on-board crane for use in shallow water or confined spaces.

Severns have comprehensive electronics systems that include full MF and VHF DSC radio equipment, differential GPS navigator, an electronic chart system, VHF radio direction finder, radar and weather sensors. Provision for survivors includes comprehensive first aid equipment including stretchers, oxygen and Entonox. They carry a portable salvage pump in a water-tight container, and can also carry out pumping and fire-fighting tasks using the engine-driven general service pump.

Fleet

References

External links 

 RNLI Fleet:Severn Class

Royal National Lifeboat Institution lifeboats